Sandlapper or Sandlappers may refer to:

A resident of South Carolina (see List of demonyms for U.S. states and territories)
Sandlapper (magazine), a South Carolina magazine
Sandlapper 200, NASCAR stock car race
Columbia Sandlappers, minor league baseball team that became the Asheville Tourists
Lava bear or sand lapper, a variety of black bear once found in Oregon, United States